Patrick James "Pat" Woods (29 April 1933 – 14 August 2012) was an English footballer who scored 15 goals from 304 games in the Football League playing as a defender for Queens Park Rangers and Colchester United.

He signed in 1950 and made his debut on 3 January 1953 in a 2–0 defeat away against Coventry City. He moved to Australia in 1961, where he joined Hellenic, returning to England to play the 1963–64 season with Colchester United, before going back to Australia to play for South Coast United and Melita Eagles.

References

1933 births
2012 deaths
Footballers from Islington (district)
English footballers
Association football defenders
Queens Park Rangers F.C. players
Hellenic Athletic players
Colchester United F.C. players
South Coast United players
Parramatta FC players
English Football League players